Radcliffe-on-Trent Golf Club is a golf course in Radcliffe-on-Trent, Nottinghamshire, England.

It was founded as a nine-hole parkland golf course in 1909.  It was extended to an 18-hole course in 1925 after the club bought land from the Manvers Estate, and further remodelled on additional land in 1972 by the golf course architect Frank Pennick  The course is located approximately 5 miles to the east of Nottingham in Radcliffe-on-Trent on Cropwell Road, just south of the A52.  Its foundation was marked with a golf match on 9 October 1909 between two notable professional golfers of the time, Tom Williamson and Harry Vardon, this was watched by over 200 spectators.  The trophy, won by Vardon, was reacquired by the Club for its centenary in 2009, which was also marked with matches against Rushcliffe Golf Club which also celebrated its Centenary, and by hosting the McGregor Trophy which is the national under 16 boys stroke play tournament organised by the English Golf Union.

The course measures 6402 yards and is a par 70 with a SSS of 71. Off the ladies' tees the course measures 5570 yards and is a par 72 with a SSS of 73. The course is characterised by tight fairways lined with mature trees, and by relatively long par 3 holes.  As a private club it has a maximum of 695 male and female members.

References

External links
 Radcliffe-on-Trent Golf Club
 Radcliffe-on-Trent Golf Club Seniors Section

Golf clubs and courses in Nottinghamshire
Sports venues in Nottinghamshire
Radcliffe on Trent